Djalil may refer to:

People
 H. Tjut Djalil (born 1932), Indonesian film director and screenwriter
 Pámela Djalil, contestant in Miss Venezuela 2003
 Djalil Narjissi (born 1980), Moroccan rugby union footballer
 Djalil Palermo, panelist on the Algerian version of Masked Singer

Places
 Oum El Djalil, a town and commune in Médéa Province, Algeria

See also
 Dalil (disambiguation)
 Jalil (disambiguation)